Jean-François Hue (Saint-Arnoult-en-Yvelines, 2 December 1751 to Paris, 26 December 1823) was a French painter, known for marine and landscape paintings.

Biography 
Jean-François Hue entered the Académie Royale in 1782, due to his painting Vue prise dans la forêt de Fontainebleau.

Hue was noticed by Joseph Vernet and became the pupil of Gabriel-François Doyen in Paris. He then joined Vernet's workshop, where he painted Quatre vues du château de Mousseaux et de ses jardins (undated, 74.8 × 85.8 cm).

In 1791, the Assemblée Constituante requested he finish the series Vues des ports de mer de France that Vernet had started in 1753 and left unfinished in 1765.

Between 1792 and 1798, he created six paintings depicting the harbors of Bretagne.

Iconography 
 Entrée de l’Armée française à Gênes (24 juin 1800), 1810, Musée national du Château de Versailles

Notes and references 

 Notes

 Bibliography 
 Pierre-Auguste Miger, Les Ports de France peints par Joseph Vernet et Jean-François Hue, Paris, Lenormand, 1812, 126 p.
 Catalogue des tableaux composant le cabinet de feu M. Hüe, 
 Bibliothèque du Musée des Beaux-Arts, Tours.

18th-century French painters
19th-century French painters